Dwyfor Meirionnydd  is a constituency of the House of Commons of the Parliament of the United Kingdom (at Westminster). The seat was created by the Welsh Boundary Commission for the 2010 general election, and replaced the old north Wales seat of Meirionnydd Nant Conwy. Dwyfor Meirionnydd is bordered to the north by Arfon and Aberconwy. The same boundaries were used for the Dwyfor Meirionnydd Welsh Assembly constituency in the 2007 Welsh Assembly election.

Like its predecessors, it is a Plaid Cymru stronghold, with their candidate in 2019 achieving a majority of 15.9%.

Boundaries

The constituency was created by merging most of Meirionnydd Nant Conwy with the southern part of Caernarfon; the northern area became part of a new Arfon constituency.

The electoral wards used to create the seat are as follows. They are entirely within the preserved county of Gwynedd.

Aberdaron, Aberdyfi, Abererch, Abermaw, Abersoch, Bala, Botwnnog, Bowydd and Rhiw, Brithdir and Llanfachreth/Ganllwyd/Llanelltyd, Bryn-crug/Llanfihangel, Clynnog, Corris/Mawddwy, Criccieth, Diffwys and Maenofferen, Dolbenmaen, Dolgellau North, Dolgellau South, Dyffryn Ardudwy, Efail-newydd/Buan, Harlech, Llanaelhaearn, Llanbedr, Llanbedrog, Llandderfel, Llanengan, Llangelynin, Llanuwchllyn, Llanystumdwy, Morfa Nefyn, Nefyn, Penrhyndeudraeth, Porthmadog East, Porthmadog West, Porthmadog-Tremadog, Pwllheli North, Pwllheli South, Teigl, Trawsfynydd, Tudweiliog and Tywyn.

Members of Parliament

Elections

Elections in the 2010s

See also
 Dwyfor Meirionnydd (Senedd constituency)
 List of parliamentary constituencies in Gwynedd
 List of parliamentary constituencies in Wales

References

External links
Politics Resources (Election results from 1922 onwards)
Electoral Calculus (Election results from 1955 onwards)
2017 Election House Of Commons Library 2017 Election report
A Vision Of Britain Through Time (Constituency elector numbers)

Parliamentary constituencies in North Wales
Constituencies of the Parliament of the United Kingdom established in 2010